Out of the 6,564 streams that flow through the U.S. State of Minnesota, there are 114 streams that are at least 30 miles long.  The second longest river in the United States, the Mississippi River, originates in Minnesota before flowing south to the Gulf of Mexico.   The longest river entirely within the state of Minnesota is the Minnesota River.  Other rivers over 200 miles long include the Red River of the North, Des Moines River, Cedar River, Wapsipinicon River, Little Sioux River, and Roseau River.

Sections of several of the longest rivers define sections of the Minnesota border.  The  Red River of the North forms the border with North Dakota to the west.  The Bois de Sioux River forms the border with South Dakota to the west. The Mississippi River, St. Croix River, and the St. Louis River form the border with Wisconsin to the east.  The Rainy River and Pigeon River form the border with Ontario, Canada to the north.

Minnesota contains three major drainage basins/watersheds with waters from Minnesota rivers flowing south, north, or east. These major drainage basins meet in a triple divide point located at the Hill of Three Waters, just north of Hibbing, Minnesota. The Mississippi River drainage basin with water flowing south is made up of the Upper Mississippi River watershed (above St. Paul), Lower Mississippi River (Below St. Paul), Minnesota River drainage basin, St. Croix River drainage basin, Des Moines River drainage basin, and Missouri River drainage basin. Water flows southwards, eventually reaching the Gulf of Mexico. Minnesota water flows northward to the Hudson Bay. The Great Lakes Basin to the east includes the Lake Superior drainage basin in Minnesota and Wisconsin. Minnesota water flows eastward through the Great Lakes to the Atlantic Ocean.

Table of longest streams
A sortable table below lists the 114 streams flowing in Minnesota that have a total length of greater than or equal to 30 miles. The stream's tributary and watershed are given.  The source or mouth of some streams are in other U.S. states or Canadian provinces.  Other than border rivers, the only rivers that originate in other states are the Little Minnesota River (South Dakota), St. Croix River (Wisconsin), and Upper Tamarack River (Wisconsin).  The 21 streams that are not entirely within the state are indicated by a  after the order number.  The coordinates and location county of the mouth and source of the stream are indicated, as well as the United States Geological Survey (USGS) Geographic Names Information System ID and other references and notes.  Lengths and elevations are derived from the National Elevation Dataset or reference to it in the USGS GNIS Database. A link to an Open Street Map template is listed at the top of this article that will generate a map showing the source and mouth coordinates of all of these streams.  For consistency and accuracy, the sources for this information is primarily data from the USGS GeoNames and National Elevation database, supplemented by other sources.

Map of Minnesota streams and lakes
The map below shows the major streams and lakes in Minnesota.

Gallery

See also

Geography of Minnesota
List of longest rivers in the United States by state
List of rivers of Minnesota
List of rivers of Iowa
List of rivers of North Dakota
List of rivers of South Dakota
List of rivers of Wisconsin
List of lakes of Minnesota

Notes

References

General references

 Longest streams
Minnesota